Victor Dimukeje (born November 18, 1999) is an American football outside linebacker for the Arizona Cardinals of the National Football League (NFL). He played college football at Duke, and was drafted by the Cardinals in the sixth round of the 2021 NFL Draft.

Professional career

Dimukeje was selected by the Arizona Cardinals in the sixth round (210th overall) of the 2021 NFL Draft. He signed his four-year rookie contract with Arizona on May 25, 2021. He primarily played on special teams as a rookie.

References

Living people
Arizona Cardinals players
Duke Blue Devils football players
Players of American football from Baltimore
1999 births
American football defensive ends
American football linebackers